The Manganuiohou River is a river of the northeast of New Zealand's North Island. It flows southwards from its source in Te Urewera National Park immediately to the northwest of Lake Waikaremoana, and joins with the Waiau River at the park's southwestern boundary.

See also
List of rivers of New Zealand

References

Rivers of the Hawke's Bay Region
Rivers of New Zealand